Dolfor is a small hamlet in the north of Powys, Wales. It is located about three miles to the south of Newtown, at the junction of the B4355 and A483 roads. It is in the  historic county of Montgomeryshire

The source of the River Miwl is near the village. The church in the village is dedicated to Saint Paul.

References 

Villages in Powys